James Ryall (born 14 November 1980) is an Irish hurler who plays for his local club Graigue–Ballycallan and at senior level for the Kilkenny county team from 2002 to 2010.

Biography
James Ryall was born in Kilmanagh, County Kilkenny in 1980. He was educated locally and later attended Coláiste Éamann Rís in Kilkenny, a well known hurling school. Here his hurling talents were quickly spotted and he won a Leinster Colleges' title with the school's senior hurling team. Ryall later attended the Galway-Mayo Institute of Technology, where he was named Hurler of the Year in 2001. He currently works as a sales rep with Michael Lyng Motors Kilkenny.

Playing career

Club
Ryall plays for his local Graigue–Ballycallan club. He had some success at underage level and was on the panel when his club won the county championship in 1998 and 2000.

Inter-county
Although never having All-Ireland success at minor or under-21 level with Kilkenny, Ryall became a key member of the team after joining the panel in 2002. Within a year of joining the team he had won his first Leinster SHC and All-Ireland SHC titles, following wins over Wexford and Cork respectively. In 2004 Kilkenny were aiming to win a third All-Ireland SHC title in-a-row; however, Kilkenny ended that year without any major title. The team was back in 2005 with Ryall collecting his first National Hurling League medal, as well as a second Leinster SHC title. Galway later defeated Kilkenny in an All-Ireland SHC semi-final. In 2006 Ryall won his third Leinster SHC medal, before later collecting his second All-Ireland medal following a win over Cork.

On 8 September 2010, speculation went around that Ryall was retiring from inter-county hurling defeat by Tipperary; however, it turned out originally that the report was misquoted. In December, 2010 Ryall confirmed his retirement from inter-county hurling.

Honours
Kilkenny
All-Ireland Senior Hurling Championship:
Winner (6): 2002, 2003, 2006, 2007, 2008, 2009
Leinster Senior Hurling Championship:
Winner (8): 2002, 2003, 2005, 2006, 2007, 2008, 2009, 2010
National Hurling League:
Winner (5): 2002, 2003, 2005, 2006, 2009
Walsh Cup: 
Winner (4): 2005, 2006, 2007, 2009

References

1980 births
Living people
All-Ireland Senior Hurling Championship winners
Graigue-Ballycallan hurlers
Irish salespeople
Kilkenny inter-county hurlers